4-connected may refer to:

4-connected neighborhood in computer graphics
4-connected graph, in graph theory